Reserves of natural gas were found offshore the Gaza Strip in the year 2000, within the framework of licensing to British Gas by the Palestinian National Authority. The discovered gas field Gaza Marine, though mediocre in size, had been considered at the time as one of the possible drives to boost Palestinian economy and promote regional cooperation.

With Hamas takeover of the Gaza Strip in the year 2007, the chances for developing the gas field turned low - both due to standoff with the Ramallah administration and the Israeli refusal to deal with Hamas, being a globally recognized terror group. The chances further diminished with the discovery of major gas fields in the Israeli economic waters in 2009 and 2010, making Israel an unlikely customer for the Palestinian gas. As of early 2015, Gaza's natural gas was still underwater and the same for almost all of the Levantine gas. In the year 2018, Shell company, which had taken over British Gas earlier, decided to relinquish its 60% stake in Gaza Marine, transferring it to Palestinian state companies.

History

Licensing
The Palestinians signed a memorandum of intent on November 8, 1999 with British Gas and a company linked to the Palestinian Authority, the Consolidated Contractors Company, giving them rights to explore the area. The discovered natural gas reserve was calculated to have 35 BCM, larger than Israel's Yam Tethys maritime gas field. It was found in two small gas fields dubbed Gaza Marine 1 and Gaza Marine 2.

In 1999, Israeli Prime Minister Ehud Barak set aside exploration of Gaza's offshore resources for a future Palestinian state, with no prior consultation with Israel stipulated. According to Michael Schwartz, Barak deployed the Israeli navy in Gaza's coastal waters to impede the implementation of the terms of the modest contract between the Palestinian Authority and British Gas (BG) to develop Gaza's Mediterranean gas resources. Israel demanded that the Gaza gas be piped to facilities on its territory, and at a price below the prevailing market level and that Israel also control all the (relatively modest) revenues destined for the Palestinians — to prevent the money from being used to "fund terror." In Schwartz's view, with this Israeli action the Oslo Accords were officially doomed, because by declaring Palestinian control over gas revenues unacceptable, the Israeli government committed itself to not accepting even the most limited kind of Palestinian budgetary autonomy, let alone full sovereignty. In Schwartz's view, since no Palestinian government or organization would agree to this, a future filled with armed conflict was assured.

The Israeli veto led to the intervention of British Prime Minister Tony Blair, who sought to broker an agreement that would satisfy both the Israeli government and the Palestinian Authority. The result was a 2007 proposal that would have delivered the gas to Israel, not Egypt, at below-market prices, with the same 10% cut of the revenues eventually reaching the Palestinian Authority. However, those funds were first to be delivered to the Federal Reserve Bank in New York for future distribution, to guarantee that they would not be used for attacks on Israel.

Under Hamas administration
The Israelis pointed to the 2006 victory of the militant Hamas party in Palestinian elections as a deal-breaker. Though Hamas had agreed to let the Federal Reserve supervise all spending, the Israeli government, then led by Ehud Olmert, insisted that no "royalties be paid to the Palestinians." Instead, the Israelis would deliver the equivalent of those funds "in goods and services." 

The Hamas-led Palestinian unity government refused the offer, and soon after, Olmert imposed a blockade on Gaza, which Israel's defense minister termed a form of "'economic warfare' that would generate a political crisis, leading to a popular uprising against Hamas." With Egyptian cooperation, Israel then seized control of commerce in and out of Gaza, limiting even food imports and eliminating its fishing industry. Olmert advisor Dov Weisglass summed up this policy by saying the Israeli government was putting the Palestinians "on a diet." According to the Red Cross, this blockade produced "chronic malnutrition," especially among Gazan children.

As Moshe Ya'alon explained, "Hamas... has confirmed its capability to bomb Israel's strategic gas and electricity installations... It is clear that, without an overall military operation to uproot Hamas control of Gaza, no drilling work can take place without the consent of the radical Islamic movement."

During Arab Spring and aftermath
In 2010-11, the Israeli government of Prime Minister Benjamin Netanyahu faced an energy crisis when the events of the Arab Spring in Egypt interrupted and then stopped 40% of Israel's gas supplies. Rising energy prices contributed to some of the largest protests involving Jewish Israelis in decades. 

The Iron Dome system, developed in part to stop Hezbollah rockets aimed at Israel's northern gas fields, was put in place near the border with Gaza and was tested during Operation Returning Echo, the fourth Israeli military attempt to weaken Hamas and eliminate any Palestinian "capability to bomb Israel's strategic gas and electricity installations."

The next round of negotiations stalled over the Palestinian rejection of Israel's demand to control all fuel and revenues destined for Gaza and the West Bank. The new Palestinian Unity government then followed the lead of the Lebanese, Syrians, and Turkish Cypriots, and in late 2013 signed an "exploration concession" with Gazprom, the large Russian natural gas company. As with Lebanon and Syria, the Russian Navy was a potential deterrent to Israeli "interference."

As of early 2015, Gaza's natural gas was still underwater and the same for almost all of the Levantine gas.

British Gas exit
In 2015, the Palestinian government resumed negotiations on the agreement with BG and abrogated the exclusive rights it had given to the company. It also raised the PIF share from 10% under the old agreement to 17.5%. Subsequently, Shell acquired BG on April 8, 2016.

As of 2017, the Gaza Marine field licenses were owned by PIF with 17.5% of the field development rights, Consolidated Contractors Company owns 27.5% of these rights and Shell 55%. The development and gas extraction rights belonged to the Palestinians alone. In the year 2018, Shell company, which had taken over British Gas earlier, decided to relinquish its 60% stake in Gaza Marine, transferring it to Palestinian state companies.

See also
Natural gas in Israel

References

Energy in the Gaza Strip
Natural gas in the State of Palestine